PsycCRITIQUES was a database of reviews of books, videos, and popular films published by the American Psychological Association. It replaced the print journal Contemporary Psychology: APA Review of Books, which was published from 1956 to 2004. The official blog of PsycCRITIQUES allowed free access to the full text of some recent reviews. It was discontinued on December 31, 2017. Archives are available to the public via the Center for the History of Psychology (University of Akron) or via a paid subscription to Portico.

See also
PsycINFO

References

External links 

 at the Center for the History of Psychology at the University of Akron
PsycCRITIQUES blog

Works about psychology
Magazines established in 1956
Bibliographic databases and indexes
Book review magazines
American Psychological Association publications
Weekly magazines published in the United States
Magazines disestablished in 2017
Defunct literary magazines published in the United States
Magazines published in Washington, D.C.